Ann Turner (born December 18, 1956) is an American sprint canoer who competed from the mid-1970s to the mid-1980s. Competing in two Summer Olympics, she earned her best finish of fourth in the K-4 500 metres event at Los Angeles in 1984. She retired from the sport in 1985.

Her brother is fellow sprint canoer Brent Turner.

References

1956 births
American female canoeists
Canoeists at the 1976 Summer Olympics
Canoeists at the 1984 Summer Olympics
Living people
Olympic canoeists of the United States
21st-century American women